Lower Rancheria is a former gold-mining camp in Amador County, California. Placer mining began at Lower Rancheria in 1848.

Prior to 1855, the camp at Lower Rancheria was mostly populated by Spanish-speaking miners. On 6 August 1855 a series of murders were carried out at the camp by a group of Mexicans, who killed five men and one women and who also robbed the contents of a safe. Following this, three of the Mexicans were hanged, and the Mexican population of the camp were driven away.

References

Former settlements in Amador County, California
Former populated places in California
Populated places established in 1848